Archana is a 1966 Indian Malayalam film,  directed by K. S. Sethumadhavan and produced by T. E. Vasudevan. The film stars Madhu, Sharada, K. P. Ummer and Adoor Bhasi. The musical score is by K. Raghavan.

Cast
Madhu as Rajagopalan
Sharada as Malathi
K. P. Ummer as Gopi
Adoor Bhasi as Bhaskara Menon/Bhasi
Hari as Rajan's collegemate
Muthukulam Raghavan Pillai
Aranmula Ponnamma as Meenakshiyamma/Rajagopalan's Mother
Kumudam
Prathapachandran as Rajan's collegemate
Paul Vengola as Kainottakaran

Soundtrack

References

External links
 

1966 films
1960s Malayalam-language films
Films directed by K. S. Sethumadhavan